One Dollar Bid is a 1918 American silent drama film directed by Ernest C. Warde and starring J. Warren Kerrigan, Lois Wilson and Leatrice Joy.

Cast
 J. Warren Kerrigan as Toby
 Lois Wilson as Virginia Dare
 Joseph J. Dowling as Colonel Poindexter Dare
 Leatrice Joy as Emily Dare
 Arthur Allardt as Ralph Patterson
 Jess Herring as Dink Wallerby
 Elvira Weil as Nell Wallerby
 Clifford Alexander as Bob Clark
 John Gilbert

References

Bibliography
 Goble, Alan. The Complete Index to Literary Sources in Film. Walter de Gruyter, 1999.

External links
 

1918 films
1918 drama films
1910s English-language films
American silent feature films
Silent American drama films
American black-and-white films
Films directed by Ernest C. Warde
Films distributed by W. W. Hodkinson Corporation
1910s American films